The Rallye du Maroc is a rally-raid which is disputed each year in Morocco from 2000. The event is part of both the World Rally-Raid Championship co-sanctioned by the FIA and FIM, after previously being overseen separately by the FIA World Cup for Cross-Country Rallies and FIM Cross-Country Rallies World Championship.

In 2017, the organization of the Rallye du Maroc was officially ceded to the ODC company, represented by the rally driver David Castera, sports director of the Dakar for 10 editions, who is in charge of the rallye since the 2018 edition.

Winners by edition

See also
 Rallye du Maroc

References

External links
 Website  (3 to 9 October 2018) is a rally raid

 
Motorsport competitions in Morocco
Rally raid races
Cross Country Rally World Cup races
Recurring sporting events established in 2000